Flavobacterium cheonanense  is a bacterium from the genus of Flavobacterium.

References

cheonanense
Bacteria described in 2012